Irish Hockey League may refer to:

Field hockey
 Men's Irish Hockey League
 Women's Irish Hockey League

Ice Hockey
 Irish Ice Hockey League